The Baldwin DT-6-6-2000 (Also referred to as the Baldwin DT6-6-2000) was a twin-engined diesel-electric transfer switcher, built by Baldwin Locomotive Works between 1946 and 1950.

A single prototype using a pair of 8 cylinder nominally aspirated 608NA prime movers (engines) was built in 1946 for the Elgin, Joliet and Eastern Railway. In order to minimise the length of the locomotive, the crosswalks at the ends of the locomotives were omitted. This feature was not repeated in the subsequent locomotives. Forty-five further locomotives were built using 6-cylinder turbocharged 606SC prime movers during 1948–1950.

The DT-6-6-2000 was most popular with the Elgin, Joliet and Eastern Railway, who purchased 27 of the 46 locomotives produced. Between 1956 and 1962, all but two of these locomotives (#100 and #118) underwent a significant rebuilding program. Several locomotives were rebuilt by the EJ&E at their Joliet shops and equipped with 1,200 hp Baldwin 606A engines. The rest were sent to the EMD facility in La Grange, Illinois, where they were rebuilt and equipped with modified SW series hoods, 1,200 hp EMD 567C engines, and new control stands, as well as multiple-unit train control capability. The EJ&E rebuilt units were retired in the late 1960s, and the EMD rebuilt units were retired between 1974 and 1975. All were subsequently scrapped.

Minneapolis, Northfield and Southern Railway #21 is the final DT-6-6-2000 in existence. It is owned by the Illinois Railway Museum in Union, Illinois where it remains in operable condition.

Original buyers

References

See also
 Lima LT-2500, a similar center-cab style transfer unit.

Diesel-electric locomotives of the United States
DT-6-6-2000
C-C locomotives
Railway locomotives introduced in 1946
Standard gauge locomotives of the United States